Yan Guang (1–75 AD), courtesy name Ziling, also known as Zhuang Guang, was one of the four important sages of Yuyao.

Study
He became a scholar and studied together with Emperor Liu Xiu (courtesy name: Wenshu), known as Emperor Guangwu of Han.

Legacy 
Liu Xiu offered Yan Ziling a high position in the court. Yan refused the offer, fearing he would become corrupt, and chose to live as a hermit in the mountains. This act made Yan Ziling a famous Chinese hero and gave him a place in the Wu Shuang Pu (Table of Peerless Heroes)by Jin Guliang. The images and poems for this book are widely spread and reused over again, including in porcelain art

In popular culture 
 Yan Ziling is portrayed by Ma Tianyu in the 2016 Chinese drama Singing All Along.

Notes and references 

Legendary Chinese people
1st-century Chinese people
Chinese scholars
Chinese hermits
AD 1 births
75 deaths
Year of birth uncertain